Timóteo is a Brazilian municipality in the state of Minas Gerais, located by the Piracicaba River. The population as of 2020 was 90,568 inhabitants. The city is situated in the metropolitan area of the Steel Valley (Vale do Aço). It is the hometown of Aperam South America (old Acesita), a steel factory specialized in the production of stainless steel, now named Aperam.

The municipality contains part of the  Rio Doce State Park, created in 1944, the first state-level conservation unit in Minas Gerais.

External links 
 Official homepage

References

Municipalities in Minas Gerais